Air Srpska was an airline of the Republika Srpska, Bosnia and Herzegovina. The airline existed from 1999 to 2003.

Fleet

The Air Srpska fleet consisted of two ATR 72 turboprop aircraft leased from Jat Airways.

References

Defunct airlines of Bosnia and Herzegovina
Transport in Republika Srpska
Airlines established in 1999
Airlines disestablished in 2003
1999 establishments in Bosnia and Herzegovina